Oreokera cumulus is a species of air-breathing land snail, a terrestrial pulmonate gastropod mollusk in the family Charopidae. This species is endemic to Australia.

References

Gastropods of Australia
Oreokera
Gastropods described in 1917
Taxonomy articles created by Polbot